Transcription factor Spi-B is a protein that in humans is encoded by the SPIB gene.

Function 

SPI1 (MIM 165170) and SPIB are members of a subfamily of ETS (see ETS1; MIM 164720) transcription factors. ETS proteins share a conserved ETS domain that mediates specific DNA binding. SPIB and SPI1 bind to a purine-rich sequence, the PU box (5-prime-GAGGAA-3-prime).[supplied by OMIM]

Interactions 

SPIB has been shown to interact with MAPK3 and MAPK8.

References

Further reading

External links 
 

Transcription factors